Krolevetsky Uyezd (Кролевецкий уезд) was one of the subdivisions of the Chernigov Governorate of the Russian Empire. It was situated in the eastern part of the governorate. Its administrative centre was Krolevets.

Demographics
At the time of the Russian Empire Census of 1897, Krolevetsky Uyezd had a population of 131,089. Of these, 96.3% spoke Ukrainian, 3.0% Yiddish and 0.7% Russian as their native language.

References

 
Uyezds of Chernigov Governorate
Chernigov Governorate